James Wattana (born January 17, 1970, as วัฒนา ภู่โอบอ้อม Wattana Pu-Ob-Orm, then renamed รัชพล ภู่โอบอ้อม Ratchapol Pu-Ob-Orm in 2003) is a Thai former professional snooker player.

A professional between 1989 and 2008, and from 2009 to 2020, Wattana reached his highest ranking position – world number 3 – for the 1994–95 season. He has won three ranking tournaments, the 1992 Strachan Open and the Thailand Open in 1994 and 1995, and has finished as the runner-up in a further five ranking events. He twice reached the semi-finals of the World Snooker Championship, in 1993 and 1997. When he was defeated in the semi-finals in 1993 by Jimmy White, it was only Wattana's second appearance in the final televised stages at the Crucible Theatre, his first being the previous year when he lost in the second round to the eventual winner Stephen Hendry.

Having received two year invitational tour cards in 2014, 2016 and 2018, Wattana fell off the main tour at the end of the 2019/2020 season.

Career
Wattana won his first major tournament, the Thailand Masters, in 1986, aged only 16. As an amateur, he won the Asian Snooker Championship twice and the £6,000 first prize for winning the 1988 Kent Challenge in Hong Kong. He turned professional in 1989, after winning the 1988 World Amateur Championship. His career peaked in the mid-1990s, when he twice won the Thailand Open and rose to number three in the world rankings. Prior to Wattana becoming a professional, snooker had been dominated by British (and to a lesser extent Irish, Canadian and Australian) players.

He was the eighth professional player to earn more than £1 million in prize money, and with three maximum breaks he is one of only eighteen players to have scored more than two maximums in competition. He scored his first one in 1991 at the World Masters and the second at the British Open, which was then, at seven minutes and nine seconds, the fastest ever made.

With the help of his PR team fronted by Yorkshire business tycoon Ed Clark, Wattana's success caught the imagination of the Thai public, and he became the most admired sportsman in his home country. He helped raise the profile of the game in the Far East, and has been followed into the game by many players from Thailand, Hong Kong, and China, the most successful being Marco Fu and Ding Junhui. He is a Commander Third Class of the Most Noble Order of the Crown of Thailand, only the second sportsman to receive the country's most prestigious civilian honour.

He reached the semi-finals of the World Snooker Championship in 1993 and 1997, losing narrowly in the latter to Stephen Hendry. After a strong 2004–05 season, he returned to the top 32 of the world rankings, despite being the first player since 1992 to experience a whitewash at the World Championship when he lost 0–10 against Ali Carter in the final round of qualifying at the 2005 tournament. By 2007, his continued poor form meant that he dropped off the main tour in 2008. He continued to play, however, and in 2008 he entered the World Amateur Championships in Wels, Austria, where he lost to eventual champion Thepchaiya Un-Nooh in the last 16. He won the 2009 Asian Championships in Tangshan, China, after beating Mei Xiwen 7–3 in the final.

His position on the current provisional rankings received a huge boost with a run to the venue stage of the China Open thanks to four straight qualifying victories.

The 2011/12 season proved to be relatively good, managing to qualify in 2 of the 8 ranking events, the Shanghai Masters losing to Ronnie O'Sullivan 1–5 and the German Masters, beating Stephen Hendry 5–1 in the qualifiers, but then losing to Graeme Dott in the first round. At the end of the season he finished ranked 63, just inside the top 64.

In 2014, he lost his place on the professional snooker circuit, as he finished outside the top 64 on the official world rankings list at the end of the 2013/2014 season. However, he was one of three players awarded an invitational tour card for the next season – alongside Hendry and Steve Davis – and has since competed fairly regularly in tournaments as an amateur. In 2015, he lost in the first round of the qualifiers for the World Championship 3–10 to Jimmy White. In 2016, he lost in the first round of the qualifiers for the World Championship 6–10 to Peter Ebdon.

Performance and rankings timeline

Career finals

Ranking finals: 8 (3 titles)

Non-ranking finals: 17 (7 titles)

Pro-am finals: 3 (2 titles)

Amateur finals: 7 (5 titles)

See also
 World Professional Billiards and Snooker Association

References

External links

James Wattana at worldsnooker.com
 
 Player Profile on billiardindex.com

1970 births
Living people
James Wattana
Asian Games medalists in cue sports
Cue sports players at the 2010 Asian Games
Cue sports players at the 1998 Asian Games
James Wattana
James Wattana
Medalists at the 1998 Asian Games
Medalists at the 2010 Asian Games
James Wattana